Gary Morris is an American country music artist. His discography consists of 14 studio albums, three compilation albums, three live albums, 34 singles, and six music videos. Of his singles, 27 charted on the U.S. Billboard Hot Country Songs charts between 1980 and 1991, including five number one hits.

Albums

Studio albums

Compilation albums

Live albums

Singles

As lead artist

As featured artist

Music videos

Notes

References

Country music discographies
Discographies of American artists